Dance Dates, California 1958 is the sixth volume of The Private Collection a series documenting recordings made by American pianist, composer and bandleader Duke Ellington for his personal collection which was first publicly released on the LMR label in 1987 and later on the Saja label.

Reception
The Allmusic review by Scott Yanow stated: "Recordings like this one give one a chance to hear how Ellington rearranged tunes to make them sound fresh year after year and sometimes decade after decade".

Track listing
:All compositions by Duke Ellington except as indicated
 "Such Sweet Thunder" (Ellington, Billy Strayhorn) - 2:41  
 "Blues to Be There" (Ellington, Strayhorn) - 6:59  
 "Juniflip" - 4:05  
 "The Star-Crossed Lovers" (Ellington, Strayhorn) - 4:09  
 "Together" (Lew Brown, Buddy DeSylva, Ray Henderson) - 4:11  
 "Californio Mello" - 3:38  
 "Suburban Beauty" - 3:43  
 "C Jam Blues" (Barney Bigard, Ellington) - 6:33  
 "Blues in Orbit" (Strayhorn) - 5:03  
 "Mood Indigo" (Bigard, Ellington, Irving Mills) - 8:09  
 "Honeysuckle Rose" (Andy Razaf, Fats Waller) - 4:34  
 "Willow Weep for Me" (Ann Ronell) - 3:37  
 "Caravan" (Ellington, Mills, Juan Tizol) - 7:39  
 "Wailing Interval" - 3:39
Recorded at Mather Air Force Base, Sacramento, California on March 5, 1958.

Personnel
Duke Ellington – piano
Shorty Baker, Clark Terry - trumpet
Ray Nance - trumpet, violin, vocals 
Quentin Jackson, Britt Woodman - trombone
John Sanders - valve trombone
Jimmy Hamilton - clarinet, tenor saxophone
Bill Graham - alto saxophone 
Russell Procope - alto saxophone, clarinet 
Paul Gonsalves - tenor saxophone 
Harry Carney - baritone saxophone, clarinet, bass clarinet
Jimmy Woode - bass 
Sam Woodyard - drums
Ossie Bailey - vocals (tracks 4 & 5)

References

1987 live albums
Duke Ellington live albums
Saja Records live albums